Young Point, or Young's Point, may mean:
Young's Point, Ontario
Young Point (Antarctica)
Battle of Young's Point, Louisiana, USA
Young's Point Provincial Park, Alberta, Canada
Young's Point, a former name of Buzzard Point, Washington, DC, USA